Manuel Silvestre Sánchez (born June 2, 1965 in Barcelona, Catalonia) is a former water polo player from Spain, who was a member of the national team that won the silver medal near his home town, at the 1992 Summer Olympics in Barcelona, Spain.

See also
 Spain men's Olympic water polo team records and statistics
 List of Olympic medalists in water polo (men)
 List of men's Olympic water polo tournament goalkeepers
 List of World Aquatics Championships medalists in water polo

References
 Spanish Olympic Committee

External links
 

1965 births
Living people
Water polo players from Barcelona
Spanish male water polo players
Water polo goalkeepers
Sportsmen from Catalonia
Water polo players at the 1992 Summer Olympics
Olympic silver medalists for Spain in water polo
Medalists at the 1992 Summer Olympics
Spanish water polo coaches